George Markham (1822 – 2 February 1864) was an Irish-born Australian politician.

He was born in County Cork to British captain John Markham. He migrated to Australia in the 1840s and became an auctioneer at Armidale. On 5 March 1854 he married Susan Allingham, with whom he had five children. In 1860 he was elected to the New South Wales Legislative Assembly for New England. He retired in 1862, to be appointed superintendent for the southern district in the establishment of the Police Force, based at Cooma.

In January 1864 he was cleaning or loading his revolver in his residence when it discharged and he was fatally wounded, dying aged  and leaving a widow and five young children.

References

 

1822 births
1864 deaths
Members of the New South Wales Legislative Assembly
19th-century Australian politicians